Balázs Latrompette Yann (born 2 August 1977) is a Hungarian cross-country skier. He competed in the men's 10 kilometre classical event at the 1998 Winter Olympics.

References

1977 births
Living people
Hungarian male cross-country skiers
Olympic cross-country skiers of Hungary
Cross-country skiers at the 1998 Winter Olympics
Sportspeople from Avignon